The Rocket Forces and Artillery of the Ukrainian Ground Forces consist of units armed with tactical missiles, howitzers, cannons, mortars, jet-propelled and anti-tank artillery. They are tasked to destroy human resources, tanks, artillery, anti-tank weapons, aircraft, air defense and other important installations operations.

History 
"On the eve of the professional holiday, the 19th rocket brigade, which is stationed in |Khmelnytskyi city, conducted the main examination of the year - the final test for 2010–2011. All servicemen passed a final exams for professional, military and physical training. The history of the brigade began in 1943 at Stalingrad by establishing the 7th Artillery brigade of the Reserve of the Supreme High Command. During the Great Patriotic War 27 soldiers, sergeants and officers of the division were nominated for the award "Hero of the Soviet Union". After the declaration of Ukrainian independence and choice of the non-nuclear status, servicemen swore allegiance to people of Ukraine. In November 1997, the division gained the status of a brigade and until 2004 it was subordinated to the 1st Rocket Division of the Ukrainian Ground Forces. For the last 8 years, the brigade is directly subordinated to the command of the land forces of the Armed Forces of Ukraine, armed with the "Tochka" missile. [It] is the only rocket military unit in the Armed Forces of Ukraine."

The 1st Rocket Division was active at Khmelnytskyi, formed on the basis of the disbanding headquarters of the Soviet 43rd Rocket Army. It was formed in 1998. At least two brigades were part of the division, the 19th at Khmelnytskyi and the 107th at Kremenchug (107th Rocket Artillery Regiment, 6th Army Corps (Ukraine)). The division was disbanded in 2004. (Vad777)

The 11th Artillery Brigade was disbanded in December 2013. The 44th Artillery Brigade was created from scratch at Ternopil in September 2014. The 43rd Artillery Brigade was formed in February 2015 in Divychky, a village in Kyiv Oblast.

The 27th Reactive Artillery Regiment was upgraded to a brigade on 13 March 2015. The 40th Artillery Brigade was formed at Pervomaisk in August 2015.

Russia-Ukraine War 

After the collapse of the Soviet Union, Ukrainian Rocket Forces and Artillery were left over from the Cold War era. This means that most of its equipment is some 30 years old. There has been little development of new systems from 122mm or 152mm to 155 mm calibre. Of Ukrainian 155mm weapons built only the 2S22 Bohdana has been produced, with only one unit completed before the 2022 Russian invasion of Ukraine. The ammunition stockpiles that Ukraine inherited from the Soviet Union were the subject of sabotage. According to Radio Free Europe six stockpiles, a total of some 210,000 tons of ammunition, was destroyed between 2015 and 2019. Since late April the U.S. State Department has sold artillery ammunition to Ukraine. Ukrainian artillery has relied on old stockpiles in former Eastern Block countries for ammunition. Of 40 shells supplied by the Czech Republic only 3 worked. What the U.S. government calls "nonstandard ammunition" that can be fired from Ukrainian weapons such as 122mm, 152mm artillery shells, 120mm mortar rounds and other smalls weapons. Ukraine claims that it is firing 6,000 projectiles daily in fighting. This compares to Russia firing an estimated 70,000 projectiles.

Ukraine has asked for and been supplied with various NATO artillery firing 155 mm calibre ammunition, such as the Panzerhaubitze 2000 and "M777, FH70, M109, AHS Krab, and the CAESAR self-propelled howitzer." The UK and Germany have supplied M270 MLRS to Ukraine and the U.S. has supplied the HIMARS system, however, in batches of single digits. Ukrainian forces consider 155 mm weapons such as the M777 to be superior to their older systems: "They work beautifully. They have the precision of a sniper rifle while firing a 155mm shell. Their range is much greater than our own weapons and we can hit their positions, supply lines, and munitions depots farther away." Russian Ministry of Defence has made point of showing the destruction of Western-supplied weapons, mainly the M777. While acknowledging their effect: "General Konashenkov stressed that in recent days the Ukrainian armed forces have used M777 intensively, subjecting massive artillery strikes to Russian positions in the region." Ukraine spends 30,000 rounds of 155mm in two weeks, an amount fired by USA in a year.

Ukraine has also received 36 towed 105 mm calibre L119 light guns, a variant of the L118 light gun, from the UK. Some 36,000 rounds of 105mm ammunition has been promised to Ukraine by the US. The New Zealand Defence Force sent 30 soldiers to train Ukrainian forces on the L119 in the UK from May to July 2022.

In early July UK and New Zealand soldiers were training Ukrainian soldiers to use the L119 howitzer and the M270 MLRS in Wiltshire. The number of Ukrainian soldiers trained is listed as "hundreds".

Equipment

 9K52 Luna-M, Tochka U, Maritime Brimstone tactical ballistic missiles
 AGM-114 Hellfire Land-based man-portable semi-activelaser homing anti-materiel missile, can also be truck mounted
 BM 21-Grad, BM-21 Bastion-1, BM-21 Verba, BM-27 Uragan, BM-27 Bastion-3, BM-27 Burevyi, BM-30 Smerch, BM-30 Vilkha, M270 LRU, M142 HIMARS, RM-70, TRG-230, S-8 truck mounted multiple rocket launcher systems
 M270, TOS-1 Buratino, MT-LB S-8, MT-LB Grad tracked multiple rocket launcher systems
 2S1 Gvozdika, 2S3 Akatsiya, 2S5 Giatsint-S, 2S7 Pion, 2S19 Msta-S, 2S22 Bohdana, 152mm SpGH DANA, 155 mm SpGH Zuzana, PzH 2000, M109, AHS Krab, AS-90, MT-LB D-44, MT-LB D-30 tracked self-propelled artillery howitzers
 CAESAR, Archer Artillery System wheeled self-propelled artillery howitzers
 D-30, D-20, M-46,2A65 Msta-B, 2A36 Giatsint-B, M114, M777, M101, FH70, L119, M119, TRF1, OTO Melara Mod 56 towed howitzers
 9K114 Shturm, 9M113 Konkurs, 2A29/MT-12 Rapira towed anti-tank guns
 MT-LB-12 (TD) tracked tank destroyer
 Pansarvärnspjäs 1110 anti-tank towed recoilless rifle
 82 mm and 120 mm mortars (both from Western and Soviet manufacture)
 2S9 Nona, Panzermörser M113 and Bars-8MMk self propelled mortars (the first also used by the Air Assault Forces)

Under development for the RF&A:

 Korshun-2 cruise missile
 Hrim-2 and Sapsan tactical ballistic missile 

Future acquisitions:

 Boxer RCH-155 wheeled self-propelled artillery howitzers

Retired from the RF&A:

 R-17 Elbrus tactical ballistic missile

Current structure

 19th Missile Brigade "Saint Barbara" (OTR-21 Tochka-U), Khmelnytskyi
 27th Rocket Artillery Brigade "Sumy" (BM-27 Uragan), Sumy
 43rd Heavy Artillery Brigade (2S7 Pion), Pereiaslav
 45th Artillery Brigade (Reserve)
 38th Artillery Brigade
 26th Artillery Brigade (Operational Command North), Berdychiv
 40th Artillery Brigade (Operational Command South), Pervomaisk
 44th Artillery Brigade (Operational Command West), Ternopil
 55th Artillery Brigade (Operational Command East), Zaporizhia
 6th Artillery Training Regiment, Divychky
 15th Rocket Artillery Regiment "Kyiv" (BM-30 Smerch), Drogobych
 107th Rocket Artillery Brigade (BM-30 Smerch), Kremenchuk
 Brigade Artillery Group 1st Tank Brigade
 Brigade Artillery Group 10th Mountain Brigade
 Brigade Artillery Group 14th Mechanized Brigade
 Brigade Artillery Group 17th Tank Brigade
 Brigade Artillery Group 24th Mechanized Brigade
 Brigade Artillery Group 28th Mechanized Brigade
 Brigade Artillery Group 30th Mechanized Brigade
 Brigade Artillery Group 53rd Mechanized Brigade
 Brigade Artillery Group 54th Mechanized Brigade
 Brigade Artillery Group 56th Motorized Brigade
 Brigade Artillery Group 57th Motorized Brigade
 Brigade Artillery Group 58th Motorized Brigade
 Brigade Artillery Group 59th Motorized Brigade
 Brigade Artillery Group 61st Jager Infantry Brigade (Light)
 Brigade Artillery Group 72nd Mechanized Brigade
 Brigade Artillery Group 92nd Mechanized Brigade
 Brigade Artillery Group 93rd Mechanized Brigade
 Brigade Artillery Group 128th Mountain Brigade

References

 Feskov – V.I. Feskov, K.A. Kalashnikov, V.I. Golikov, The Soviet Army in the Years of the Cold War 1945–91, Tomsk University Publishing House, Tomsk, 2004
 Lenskiy – А. Г. Ленский, Сухопутные силы РККА в предвоенные годы. Справочник. — Санкт-Петербург Б&К, 2000

Ground Forces of Ukraine
Artillery administrative corps